Max Ploetzeneder (born 5 April 1971) is an Austrian snowboarder. He competed in the men's halfpipe event at the 1998 Winter Olympics.

References

External links
 

1971 births
Living people
Austrian male snowboarders
Olympic snowboarders of Austria
Snowboarders at the 1998 Winter Olympics